Denmark participated at the 2015 Summer Universiade in Gwangju, South Korea.

Competitors

Medal summary

Medal by sports

Medalists

References
 Country overview: Denmark on the official website

2015 in Danish sport
Nations at the 2015 Summer Universiade